Judd King (1872–1958) was a 20th-century American historical lecturer, writer, and political consultant at the University of Michigan, Ann Arbor, best known for serving as director of the National Popular Government League (1933–1958).

Background

King was born on April 19, 1872, in Waterford, Pennsylvania. From 1889 to 1893 he attended Battle Creek College and then attended the University of Michigan, Ann Arbor, graduating in 1896.

Career

In 1902, King founded and edited the Morning Sun in Denison, Texas. In 1905, he served for a year as editor of the Independent Voter in Toledo, Ohio.

In 1908 to 1910, King served as Field Secretary of the Ohio Direct Legislation League.

In 1933 to 1958, he served as Director of the National Popular Government League (NPGL). In May 1920, NGPL published a 67-page Report upon the Illegal Practices of the United States Department of Justice; most of the writing was done by Swinburne Hale of the radical law firm Hale, Nelles & Shorr.

In 1935 to 1944, he worked concurrently as a special consultant to the Rural Electrification Administration.

Personal life
In 1912, King married the suffragist Dr. Cora Smith Eaton. In 1926, he married Bertha Hale White, the former Executive Secretary of the Socialist Party of America.

Death and legacy
He died on July 4, 1958 in Washington, DC.

White donated his papers for the Library of Congress.

See also

 Cora Smith Eaton
 Bertha Hale White
 Swinburne Hale

References

External links
 Library of Congress: Judson King: A Register of His Papers

1872 births
1958 deaths
People from Waterford, Pennsylvania
University of Michigan alumni
Andrews University alumni